"Jesus or a Gun" is a song by American alternative rock band Fuel. It was released in April 1999 as the fourth single from their debut studio album, Sunburn. The track stands out among other Fuel singles due to its fast tempo and heaviness. When played on MTV or radio stations, the title is censored to read "Jesus or a ..." and the chorus lyric mutes the word "Gun".

Track listing
 "Jesus or a Gun"

Charts

References

Notes

Fuel (band) songs
1998 songs
1999 singles
Songs written by Carl Bell (musician)
Epic Records singles
Songs about Jesus